The I-205 busway was a partially built busway along the right-of-way of the Interstate 205 freeway in Portland, Oregon.  Although it never opened as a busway, its right-of-way has been in use by light rail lines partially since 2001 and fully since 2009.

The transitway, which was physically separate from the parallel freeway lanes, was planned in the mid- and late 1970s as part of the final segment of I-205.  Only a graded route with several entrance ramps and two underpass tunnels under I-205 were built.  No bridges or overpasses were built until later adaptation for use by MAX Light Rail trains.

The transitway's right-of-way started in the median of I-205 near Portland International Airport and ran south to the junction of I-205 & I-84, where it continued through an underpass under the northbound lanes of I-205. From here it followed the freeway's east embankment to just south of Market Street, where it once again entered a tunnel taking it under the freeway. This tunnel took the right-of-way underneath all lanes (both directions) of  I-205, surfacing west of the freeway's southbound lanes at a point just north of Division Street. From there, it continued south along the west side of I-205 to SE Foster Road, where it ended. The entire transitway has now been adapted for use by TriMet light rail trains.

History

In the mid-1970s, Multnomah County officials negotiated a number of improvements to the proposed I-205 freeway with the Oregon Department of Transportation in order to win their support.  Among them was the transitway, a bike path and reconfigured interchanges.  The transitway was intended to connect at Gateway into the proposed Banfield Transitway, which originally was to have been a busway and would have run along I-84 to the Lloyd District and Downtown.

By the late 1970s, light rail became the selected transit mode in the Banfield corridor and opened in 1986 as Portland's first light rail line (now a portion of the Blue Line).  When light rail was selected over the busway option in the Banfield corridor, the fate of the proposed I-205 busway was sealed, although the corridor was, since the late 1970s, considered a potential future light rail line.

The Blue Line uses a short portion of the transitway between the Gateway station and Burnside Street, opened in 1986. The portion of the route north from Gateway opened in September 2001 as the Red Line. The portion south from Burnside (and beyond to the Clackamas Town Center) opened in September 2009 as the Green Line.

Stations

Names of possible stations, as originally proposed in the 1970s, with corresponding later developments:

Sandy-Columbia became the Parkrose/Sumner Transit Center station on the Red Line
Gateway became the Gateway/Northeast 99th Avenue Transit Center station on the Blue, Green and Red lines
Mall 205 became the Southeast Main Street station on the Green Line
Division became Southeast Division Street station on the Green Line
Powell became Southeast Powell Boulevard station on the Green Line
Holgate became Southeast Holgate Boulevard station on the Green Line
Lents became Lents Town Center/Southeast Foster Road station on the Green Line

See also 
 Mount Hood Freeway
 I-205 Bike Path

References

External links
Map: 

History of transportation in Oregon
Light rail in Oregon
Transportation in Portland, Oregon